The Dawood University of Engineering and Technology (initials:DUET) is a public university located in Karachi, Sindh, Pakistan. It was established by The Dawood Foundation and is named after Seth Ahmed Dawood.

History and overview
Dawood College of Engineering and Technology was established in 1962 as a federal government engineering institution. Initial financial endowment and foundation stone of the Dawood College of Engineering and Technology was laid by then President of Pakistan Field Marshal Mohammad Ayub Khan in 1962. It was established by Dawood Foundation under the supervision of Seth Ahmed Dawood in 1964. 

It is regarded as one of the oldest institutions of higher learning in engineering in Pakistan and pioneer in the fields of electronics, chemical, petroleum, metallurgical and industrial engineering degrees.

Recognized university
It is one of the notable institutions in Karachi and secured its place in the engineering category by the Higher Education Commission of Pakistan, as of 2010.

Before 2013 Dawood University was affiliated with NED University of Engineering & Technology. 

In 2013, Government of Sindh upgraded it into a full-fledged university renaming it 'Dawood University of Engineering and Technology'.

Academics

Bachelor's programs
 BS Computer Science
 BS Mathematics
 BS Business and Information Systems
 BS Chemistry
 BS Environmental Sciences
 BS Artificial Intelligence 
 BS Cyber Security 
 BE Chemical Engineering
 BE Electronic Engineering
 BE Industrial Engineering and Management
 BE Metallurgy and Materials Engineering
 BE Petroleum and Gas Engineering 
 BE Telecommunication Engineering
 BE Computer System Engineering
 BE Energy and Environment Engineering
 BArch Architecture and Planning

Master's programs
 MS Telecommunication Engineering 
 MS Chemical Engineering
 MS Electronic Engineering
 MS Metallurgy and Materials Engineering
 MS Industrial Engineering and Management
 MS Industrial Chemistry

Doctoral programs
 PhD Telecommunication Engineering
PhD Chemical Engineering
 PhD Electronic Engineering
 PhD Computer System Engineering
 PhD Metallurgy and Material Engineering
 PhD Industrial And Management Engineering

See also
 Dawood Group
 NED University of Engineering and Technology, Karachi
 Mehran University of Engineering and Technology, Jamshoro
 List of universities in Pakistan
 List of engineering universities and colleges in Pakistan

References

External links
 DUET official website

Engineering universities and colleges in Pakistan
Universities and colleges in Karachi
Public universities and colleges in Sindh
Educational institutions established in 1962
1962 establishments in Pakistan